Rutgers University–Camden is one of three regional campuses of Rutgers University, a public land-grant research university consisting of four campuses in New Jersey. It is located in Camden, New Jersey. Founded in 1929 as the South Jersey Law School, Rutgers–Camden began as an amalgam of the South Jersey Law School and the College of South Jersey. It is the southernmost of the three regional campuses of Rutgers—the others being located in New Brunswick and Newark. It is classified among "R2: Doctoral Universities – High research activity".

Academics
Rutgers–Camden is accredited by the Middle States Commission on Higher Education. It has nearly 40 majors and 50 minors plus special programs, an Honors College, hands-on research with faculty mentors, study abroad, internships, civic learning, and various graduate and advanced professional programs. The academic year follows a 4-4 schedule of two four-course semesters, fall and spring. During the winter study term, students study various courses outside of typical curriculum for 3 weeks in January. Rutgers students often take the winter study term to pursue internships or work on intensive research projects.

College of Arts and Sciences

The College of Arts and Sciences is the largest academic unit at Rutgers–Camden. Students enjoy the advantages of a personalized liberal arts education as well as the benefits of studying at a campus of a research university, particularly the opportunity to work closely with distinguished faculty. Majors and programs include studies in the humanities, the arts, the social sciences, and the natural and physical sciences, including those in traditional liberal arts fields as well as more professionally oriented courses of study. The College of Arts and Sciences also has a highly selective Honors College, which offers a challenging academic program that includes seminars, junior and senior year projects, and extracurricular activities.

Graduate and Professional Programs
The Graduate School offers 14 programs granting master's degrees in several liberal arts disciplines including history, English literature, languages, and creative writing, as well as advanced degrees in the biological, chemical, computer, and mathematical sciences, nursing, psychology, social work, political science and public policy, and Doctoral programs in Childhood Studies, Computational Biology, and Public Affairs with emphasis on community development. An MBA program is offered through the Rutgers School of Business-Camden.

Visual and Performing Arts

The Rutgers–Camden Center for the Arts provides performances, exhibitions, education programs, and community projects. The Fine Arts Building on the Rutgers–Camden campus houses the Walter K. Gordon Theater, Black Box Theater, and the Stedman Gallery. The Gordon Theater is the home venue for the Collingswood-based Symphony in C.

The Rutgers School of Business–Camden

The Rutgers School of Business is accredited by The Association to Advance Collegiate Schools of Business (AACSB).

The Rutgers Law School
The Rutgers Law School is a center of legal education, with two campuses—in Camden and Newark. Its faculty is internationally recognized in a number of fields including constitutional, criminal, health, and corporate law. Its alumni are leading members of the bar in public and private practice settings throughout the nation. The school is well represented among the state and federal judiciary. The law school is a member of the Association of American Law Schools and is on the list of approved schools of the American Bar Association. It offers a three-year course of study for full-time students and a four-year, part-time program leading to the awarding of the Juris Doctor degree."

The Rutgers School of Nursing–Camden
The Rutgers School of Nursing–Camden offers curricula that integrate nursing knowledge and clinical practice, including baccalaureate programs for traditional students, registered nurse students, and second-degree students; a doctor of nursing practice program; and certification in school nursing and wound ostomy continence nursing.

Libraries
The Paul Robeson Library develops and maintains access to materials that support undergraduate and graduate coursework and research. A designated Federal Depository for the First U.S. Congressional District, the library serves as a public resource for the citizens of New Jersey. Library faculty deliver comprehensive support for reference and research questions in their subject areas. Through the Paul Robeson Library, the Rutgers–Camden community may access the global resources of the Rutgers University Library System. The Robeson library also serves as the academic library for students and faculty at the Camden campuses of Camden County College and Rowan University.

Law Library  One of New Jersey's largest law libraries serves as a research facility for law students, legal practitioners, and the general public. The Law Library houses a collection of over 440,000 books and other materials, and the collection is comprehensive in its holdings of American, English, Canadian, and foreign legal periodicals. The Law Library is located on three floors of the Law School Building. A selective federal depository, the Rutgers–Camden Law Library hosts numerous online collections of public documents related to federal and New Jersey courts.

Campus

Dorms and student housing

Undergraduate and graduate dorms are located at Third and Cooper Streets, and a graduate residence hall is located at 330 Cooper Street. The twelve-story residence hall is the tallest building on campus. Many students live off campus in Camden's Cooper Grant neighborhood, in Philadelphia, or in surrounding suburbs such as Collingswood and Haddonfield.

Alumni House
The Rutgers Alumni House is located at 312 Cooper Street, in a historic mansion built in 1809,  and serves the alumni of all four Rutgers University campuses.

Writers House
The Rutgers Writers House is located at 305 Cooper Street, in a house historically known as the Dr. Henry Genet Taylor House. The house is home to the university's MFA in Creative Writing Program, as well as the journals Cooper Street and StoryQuarterly. The Writers House hosts writers, scholars, and others for various programs.

Rutgers-Camden Center for the Arts
North of the campus green, The Rutgers-Camden Center for the Arts houses the Stedman Art Gallery, the Gordon Theater, and the Black Box theater.

Mid-Atlantic Regional Center for the Humanities
Rutgers-Camden is home to the Mid-Atlantic Regional Center for the Humanities (MARCH), a public humanities learning and professional center which publishes the Encyclopedia of Greater Philadelphia, hosts fellowships, and sponsors research projects on the Mid-Atlanic region.

Transportation services

Regional rail access to the university is provided by the PATCO's City Hall station, located two blocks from center campus, and the RiverLINE's Cooper Street - Rutgers University station. The Walter Rand Transportation Center is located a few blocks from campus, which provides access to several NJTransit bus lines. Additionally, the seasonally operated RiverLink Ferry running between Camden and Philadelphia has a stop at the nearby Adventure Aquarium.

As a service to students of the university, the Rutgers–Camden Police Department provides "a walking security escort for individuals to their vehicles; campus housing; the PATCO Hi-Speed Line station at Fifth and Market St.; and the Walter Rand Transportation Center on Broadway". The campus also runs shuttle buses with stops throughout the campus.

Athletics

The Rutgers–Camden's athletic teams are called the Scarlet Raptors. The university is a member in the Division III level of the National Collegiate Athletic Association (NCAA), primarily competing in the New Jersey Athletic Conference (NJAC) for most of its sports since the 1985–86 academic year; except men's golf and women's volleyball, which the NJAC does not sponsor either. In those two sports, the Scarlet Raptors are members of the United East Conference (UEC) for men's golf and the Eastern College Athletic Conference (ECAC) for women's volleyball.

Rutgers–Camden competes in 17 intercollegiate varsity sports (8 for men and 9 for women): Men's sports include baseball, basketball, cross country, golf, soccer, tennis and track & field (indoor and outdoor); while women's sports include basketball, cross country, golf, lacrosse, soccer, baseball, tennis, track & field (indoor and outdoor) and volleyball.

Achievements
In 2006, Rutgers–Camden earned its first NCAA Division III national championship when the softball team defeated top-ranked and two-time defending champion St. Thomas (Minn.), 3–2. Rutgers–Camden set program marks with a 47–5 record and a 29-game winning streak.

In 2012 and 2013, Rutgers–Camden student-athlete Tim VanLiew won back-to-back NCAA Men's Division III Outdoor Track and Field Championships in the javelin. Nearly a year to the day of his first title, he not only defended his national javelin title, but he did so in record-breaking fashion. VanLiew's throw of  set the all-time NCAA Division III record for the new javelin, while shattering the NCAA Championship record, the University of Wisconsin–La Crosse stadium mark, and VanLiew's old Rutgers–Camden program record in the process.

Rutgers–Camden's men's soccer team went a school-record 37 consecutive games without a loss, a record that spanned the 2012 and 2013 seasons. The team compiled a 32–0–5 record during that time, the eighth-longest streak in NCAA Division III men's soccer history. The team earned a trip to the NCAA Division III National Championship for the first time in program history by defeating Loras College, 3–2, in overtime on Dec. 6, 2013, in San Antonio, Texas. The unbeaten streak came to an end on Dec. 7, 2013, in a 2–1 double-overtime loss to Messiah College in the NCAA Division III National Championship. The men's soccer team won three consecutive NJAC titles and in 2013 finished ranked No. 3 in the D3soccer.com Top 25 and No. 4 in the NSCAA national poll.

Student life

Student body
Approximately 6,600 undergraduate and graduate students attend Rutgers–Camden. Nearly 600 students live on campus. Renowned for its commitment for diversity, the student body is made up of students from 29 states and 33 countries. There are many clubs that represent various ethnic and racial groups, various religious denominations, political beliefs, and an LGBTQ club. There have been over 43,000 graduates as of 2016

Student media
 The Gleaner independent weekly newspaper; includes Features, Arts & Entertainment, Commentary, Weekly Word, Comics/Horoscope, Sports
  WCCR-Camden Internet-based radio station

Scholarly journals and publications
 Cooper Street
 Mickle Street Review
 Rutgers Journal of Law and Public Policy (J.L.P.P.)
 Rutgers Journal of Law and Religion 
 Rutgers Law Journal
 StoryQuarterly
 The Encyclopedia of Greater Philadelphia
 Mid-Atlantic Regional Center for the Humanities

Notable alumni

 Wayne R. Bryant, J.D. 1972 — New Jersey Senator (1995-2008)
 William T. Cahill, J.D. 1937  46th Governor of New Jersey (1970-1974)
 Bonnie Watson Coleman, attended, Member of the U.S. House of Representatives representing New Jersey's 12th District. 
 James J. Florio, J.D. 1967, 49th Governor of New Jersey (1990–1994)
 Frank J. Giordano, Class of 1972, President and CEO of the Philly Pops Orchestra, former president of the Union League of Philadelphia
 Charles Hallahan, Class of 1969, actor (The Thing, Hunter)
 Michael B Lavery, J.D. 1989, Current Chairman of the New Jersey Republican State Committee and former Mayor of Hackettstown.
 Kenneth LeFevre — Class of 1976, member of the New Jersey General Assembly 1996–2002
 Paul Lisicky, Class of 1983, MFA 1986, author, creative writing professor, 2016 Guggenheim Fellow 
 Walt MacDonald, Class of 1974 — CEO of Educational Testing Services
 Gene Muller, Class of 1977, founder and CEO of Flying Fish Brewing
 Joseph A. Mussomeli, J.D. 1978, former ambassador to Slovenia and Cambodia
 Daniel Nester, Class of 1991, poet and essayist
 Donald Norcross, attended, Member of the U.S. House of Representatives representing New Jersey's 1st District. 
 George Norcross, attended, Insurance executive and chairman of Cooper Health System
 John C. Norcross, Class of 1980, author, psychiatrist, university professor
 Brian T. Attard, Class of 2006, host of The Sports Box podcast
 Wendy Osefo, Ph.D. 2016, political commentator and assistant professor at Johns Hopkins University
 Gregory Pardlo, Class of 1999, poet, recipient of the 2015 Pulitzer Prize for Poetry
 Robert Pulcini, Class of 1989 — Academy Award nominated documentary and feature filmmaker, co-director of American Splendor
 Dana Redd, Class of 1989, former Mayor of Camden, New Jersey.
 Eduardo Robreno, J.D. 1978, Federal Judge for the United States District Court for the Eastern District of Pennsylvania
 Maria Rodriguez-Gregg, Class of 2013, member of the New Jersey General Assembly
 Gregory M. Sleet, J.D. 1976, Federal Judge for the United States District Court for the District of Delaware

See also

Henry Rutgers
List of Rutgers University people
Presidents of Rutgers University
Rutgers University
Post-secondary education in New Jersey
List of American state universities

References

External links

Official athletics website

 
Rutgers A
Rutgers A
Rutgers A
Educational institutions established in 1926
Rutgers A
Public universities and colleges in New Jersey
1926 establishments in New Jersey